Heinrich Hencky (2 November 1885 – 6 July 1951) was a German engineer.
Born in Ansbach, he studied civil engineering in Munich and received his PhD from the Technische Hochschule Darmstadt. In 1913, he joined a railway company in Kharkiv, Ukraine. On the outbreak of World War I he was interned. After the war he taught at Darmstadt, Dresden and at Delft in the Netherlands.

At Delft University of Technology he worked on slip-line theory, plasticity and rheology, for which he is best known.

In 1930 he went to Massachusetts Institute of Technology and in 1931 gave one of the first lectures on rheology. He returned to Delft and then to Germany. In 1936 he went to Russia, teaching at Kharkiv and Moscow.

Hencky died in a climbing accident at the age of 65.

See also
 Maxwell–Huber–Hencky–von Mises theory
 Hencky strain

Works 
 H. Hencky, "Der Spannungszustand in rechteckigen Platten". Mit 12 Abb. im Text und 7 Tafeln. München und Berlin, R. Oldenbourg, 1913
 H. Hencky,  "Über einige statisch bestimmte Falle des Gleichgewichts in plastischen Korpern" - Z. Angew. Math. Mech, 1923 
 H. Hencky, „Über die Form des Elastizitätsgesetzes bei ideal elastischen Stoffen“. Zeitschrift für technische Physik, 9, 215-220 (1928)

References

External links 
 
 Structure, Deformation, and Integrity of Materials: Fundamentals and elasticity
 Deformation Theory of Plasticity

Engineers from Bavaria
Technical University of Munich alumni
1885 births
1951 deaths
Academic staff of Technische Universität Darmstadt
People from Ansbach